RER B is one of the five lines in the Réseau Express Régional (English: Regional Express Network), a hybrid commuter rail and rapid transit system serving Paris, France and its Île-de-France suburbs. The  RER B line crosses the region from north to south, with all trains serving a group of stations in central Paris, before branching out towards the ends of the line.

The line opened in stages starting in December 1977 by connecting two existing suburban commuter rail lines with a new tunnel under Paris: the Chemin de Fer du Nord to the north (which formerly terminated at Gare du Nord) and the Ligne de Sceaux to the south (which formerly terminated at Luxembourg station).

The RER B, along with the rest of the RER network, has had a significant social impact on Paris and the surrounding region by speeding up trips across central Paris, by making far fewer stops than the Paris Métro and by bringing far-flung suburbs within easy reach of the city centre. The line has far exceeded all traffic expectations, with passengers taking 165 million journeys per year in 2004. That makes the RER B the second busiest single rail line in Europe (after RER A).

The line faces capacity challenges as a result of sharing a tunnel with RER D trains between Châtelet–Les Halles and Gare du Nord.

Chronology
The RER B opened in stages starting in December 1977 by connecting two existing suburban commuter rail lines with a new tunnel under Paris: the Chemin de Fer du Nord to the north (which formerly terminated at Gare du Nord) and the Ligne de Sceaux to the south (which formerly terminated at Luxembourg station).
 June 1846: The Ligne de Sceaux from Massy to Denfert-Rochereau opens to the public.
 1862: The Chemin de Fer du Nord line from Paris to Soissons via Mitry-Claye is opened.
 1895: The Ligne de Sceaux is extended from Denfert-Rochereau to Luxembourg.
 1937: The CMP (the operator of the Paris Métro and predecessor of today's RATP) purchases the Ligne de Sceaux, planning to integrate it into a future regional metro network, now known as the Réseau Express Régional (RER).
 December 1977: The Ligne de Sceaux is extended north  from Luxembourg station to Châtelet-les Halles station and becomes the RER B.
 December 1981: The RER B is extended north  from Châtelet-les Halles station to Gare du Nord connecting with trains to Mitry-Claye and the airport. Because the lines north of Gare du Nord used a different electrification system (1.5 kV DC to the south, 25 kV AC to the north), passengers need to make a cross-platform transfer between trains on the north and south lines.
 January 1983: A new station, Parc-des-Expositions, opens between Villepinte and Roissy.
 June 1983: Improvements and dual-voltage equipment allow trains to begin travelling thru Gare du Nord and across entire length of the line.
 February 1988: A new station, St-Michel – Notre-Dame opens between Luxembourg and Châtelet in order to offer a quick connection with RER C and Paris Métro Line 10 at Cluny – La Sorbonne, a station which had been closed since World War II and was entirely renovated.
 October 1991: OrlyVAL line opens, connecting Antony station with Orly Airport.
 January 1998: A new station, La Plaine–Stade de France, opens near the Stade de France in time for the 1998 FIFA World Cup.

List of RER B stations

 RER B3
 Aéroport Charles de Gaulle 2 – TGV
 Aéroport Charles de Gaulle 1
 Parc des Expositions
 Villepinte
 Sevran – Beaudottes
 B5
 Mitry – Claye
 Villeparisis – Mitry-le-Neuf
 Vert-Galant
 Sevran – Livry
 Aulnay-sous-Bois
 Le Blanc-Mesnil
 Drancy
 Le Bourget
 La Courneuve – Aubervilliers
 La Plaine – Stade de France
 Gare du Nord
 Châtelet – Les Halles
 St-Michel – Notre-Dame
 Luxembourg
 Port-Royal
 Denfert-Rochereau
 Cité Universitaire
 Gentilly
 Laplace
 Arcueil–Cachan
 Bagneux
 Bourg-la-Reine
 B2
 Sceaux
 Fontenay-aux-Roses
 Robinson
 B4
 Parc de Sceaux
 La Croix de Berny
 Antony
 Fontaine-Michalon
 Les Baconnets
 Massy – Verrières
 Massy – Palaiseau
 Palaiseau
 Palaiseau – Villebon
 Lozère
 Le Guichet
 Orsay – Ville
 Bures-sur-Yvette
 La Hacquinière
 Gif-sur-Yvette
 Courcelle-sur-Yvette
 Saint-Rémy-lès-Chevreuse

Service patterns
The RER B Line has two service patterns:

 Off-peak hours on weekdays, Saturdays and Sundays
 Rush hour during the week (and special events such as matches at the Stade de France or construction work)
In any case, the stations from Cité Universitaire to Paris Gare du Nord are served by every single train.

Off-peak service
In 2021, the off-peak service is made up of 3 missions per 1 / 4H:

To the south:

 Mission K, (KALI, KARE, etc.) for Massy-Palaiseau (Massy)
Non-stop train between CDG and Paris, then local train from Paris to Massy

 Mission S, (SVAN, SOLO, etc.) for Robinson
Local train on the entire line between Mitry—-Claye and Robinson

 Mission P, (PEPE, PILE, etc.) for St Remy-lès-Chevreuse
Local train between CDG and Paris, rapid/semi-direct train between Paris and Massy-Palaiseau, then local train to St Remy
To the north:

Mission E, (EKLI, ELAN, etc.) for CDG2
Local train in the south between Massy and Paris, then non-stop/direct train between Paris and CDG2

Mission E, (EFLA, ERGE, etc.) for CDG2
Local train between St Remy and Massy, rapid/semi-direct train between Massy and Paris, then local train from Paris to CDG

Mission I, (IBIS, IMRE, etc.) for Mitry-Mory
Local train on the whole line

Rush hour service

Rush hour is between 07:00 and 09:45 in the morning and between 16:00 and 20:00 in the afternoon.

In 2021 the rush hour service is made up of 4 missions per 1 / 4H:

General scheme 
In the northern section after Paris Gare du Nord, all trains are local trains.

To the south:

 Mission K, (KALI, KARE, etc ...) for Massy-Palaiseau (Massy)
Rapid train from Paris to Massy

 Mission L, (LUNE, LEVE, etc ...) for Orsay
Rapid train from Paris to Massy then local train between Massy and Orsay

 Mission S, (SVAN, SOLO, etc ...) for Robinson
Local train until Robinson

 Mission P, (PEPE, PILE, etc ...) for St Remy-lès-Chevreuse
Semi-direct train between Paris and Massy-Palaiseau, non-stop train between Massy and Orsay, then local train between Orsay and St Remy
To the north:

In the northern section after Paris Gare du Nord, all trains are local trains.

 2 Mission E to Roissy
 2 Mission I to Mitry Mory

Some infrequent missions can be seen such as missions J to Denfert Rochereau in the evening.

Mission code
RER B mission codes are made up of four letters followed by two numbers. The first letter always indicates the destination.

Rolling stock
RER B is operated by 117 sets of the MI 79 series and 31 sets of the MI 84 series. These are to be replaced from 2025 by the MI 20 series.

Past fleet include the MS 61, which operated on the line from 29 June 1967 to 28 February 1983, and the Class Z 23000, which operated from 16 November 1937 to 27 February 1987.

See also
 List of stations of the Paris Métro
 List of stations of the Paris RER

References

External links
 RATP official website  (in French)
 RATP website in English

B0, RER B
Railway lines opened in 1977
1977 establishments in France